Notocelia trimaculana is a moth of the family Tortricidae. It is found in the Palearctic realm.

The wingspan is 15–18 mm. It differs from Notocelia rosaecolana as follows : forewings somewhat narrower, costa less arched, fold reaching middle, ground-colour much mixed and marked with grey except on a quadrate dorsal spot beyond basal patch ; hindwings grey.
The larva is reddish-brown, sometimes tinged with greenish ; head light brown ; plate of 2 black : on hawthorn.

The moth flies from June to July depending on the location.

The larvae feed on Crataegus, Prunus spinosa and Pyrus .

References

External links
 Microplepidoptera.nl 
 Lepidoptera of Belgium
 UK Moths

Olethreutinae
Moths of Europe